James Joseph Callahan (March 18, 1874 – October 4, 1934) was an American pitcher and left fielder in Major League Baseball (MLB) for the Philadelphia Phillies, Chicago Colts/Orphans, and Chicago White Sox.  He also managed the White Sox, as well as the Pittsburgh Pirates. In 1902, he pitched the first no-hitter in American League history.

Though best known today by his childhood nickname "Nixey", in reality, he was seldom ever referred to by that name in contemporary sources during his playing days, as he instead preferred to go by Jimmy (or James) Callahan.

Early life
Callahan was born in Fitchburg, Massachusetts on March 18, 1874. He played amateur baseball throughout Massachusetts.

Professional baseball

As a player
Callahan made his debut for the 1894 Philadelphia Phillies, the National League team run by Arthur Irwin. Callahan pitched in nine games that year, giving up more than an earned run per inning, so he was sent to the minor leagues for the 1895 season. He came back up to the major leagues in 1897 with the Chicago Cubs, where he stayed for four seasons.

On September 20, 1902, Callahan pitched the first no-hitter in American League history. Remarkably, only two years earlier, in the other extreme of his career, he had given up 48 hits in two consecutive starts in 1900, yielding 23 on September 11 and 25 in the game before.

Callahan is also the only pitcher to have collected five hits in a game three times: June 29, 1897; May 18, 1902; and May 18, 1903.

Callahan finished his major league career with 901 hits and 99 wins. Since then, no player has matched both these numbers, although Babe Ruth came close. Three nineteenth-century pitcher/infielders beat these numbers: John Montgomery Ward, Kid Gleason and Dave Foutz.

As a manager
Callahan managed the Chicago White Sox on two separate occasions and also managed the Pittsburgh Pirates.  

* Callahan was "asked" to step down as manager, he remained as a player only.

As an owner
Callahan took a five-year break from playing in the American League to run his own semi-pro team, "Callahan's Logan Squares". He said that he did this for financial reasons, but he returned when his team's attendances fell.

Later life
Callahan died at age 60 in Boston on October 4, 1934.

See also
List of Major League Baseball no-hitters
List of Major League Baseball player-managers

References

External links

Nixie Callahan at SABR (Baseball BioProject)

1874 births
1934 deaths
Major League Baseball pitchers
Baseball players from Massachusetts
Philadelphia Phillies players
Chicago Colts players
Chicago Orphans players
Chicago White Sox players
Chicago White Sox managers
Pittsburgh Pirates managers
19th-century baseball players
Minor league baseball managers
Sportspeople from Fitchburg, Massachusetts
Philadelphia Colts players
Springfield Maroons players
Kansas City Blues (baseball) players
Major League Baseball player-managers